Admwahan railway station (Urdu and ) is located in Admwahan village, Lodhran district of Punjab province, Pakistan.

See also
 List of railway stations in Pakistan
 Pakistan Railways

References

Railway stations on Karachi–Peshawar Line (ML 1)